2BU may refer to:

 2BU (song), a 2016 song by Wild Beasts off the album Boy King
 2BU! Click Awards
 2BU rail bogie train equipment for New South Wales stainless steel carriage stock

See also

 
 B2U
 BU (disambiguation)
 BBU (disambiguation)
 Bubu (disambiguation)